Live at Wacken - The Runion is a live album by American heavy metal band Twisted Sister, released on June 28, 2005.

Track listing

Twisted Sister albums